Vladimir Tošić (also spelled Vladimir Tosic) (born 1949 in Belgrade, Yugoslavia) is a Serbian composer and visual artist.  His works are generally composed according to very stringent minimal principles, which he refers to as "reductionist principles of composing."

Tošić teaches at the Faculty of Music in Belgrade, teaching counterpoint, harmony, and musical forms.  He graduated with a composition degree from the same faculty, studying with Vasilije Mokranjac.

External links

1949 births
Living people
20th-century classical composers
Serbian composers
Academic staff of the University of Arts in Belgrade
University of Arts in Belgrade alumni
Male classical composers
20th-century male musicians